José Guilherme Merquior (April 22, 1941 – January 7, 1991) was a Brazilian diplomat, academic, writer, literary critic and philosopher.

Biography
He was a prolific writer, and member of the Academia Brasileira de Letras (the Brazilian Academy of Letters). He had a doctorate in sociology from the London School of Economics, which was directed by Ernest Gellner. Merquior also studied under Claude Lévi-Strauss (whose ideas Merquior would largely repudiate in From Prague to Paris), and took guidance from the likes of Raymond Aron, Harry Levin, and Arnaldo Momigliano. He published books written directly in French, English, Italian, and his native Portuguese.

Merquior divided his published works in two segments. In one the bulk was criticism per se; in the other the emphasis was the history of ideas, or more specific investigations like the highly esteemed study of Jean-Jacques Rousseau and Max Weber. Two of his books, Foucault (1985), an often scathing critique of Michel Foucault for the Fontana Modern Masters series, and Western Marxism (1986), were described as "minor classics" by Catholic scholar (and later, white nationalist) Gregory R. Johnson.

Merquior was a major supporter of the Fernando Collor de Mello government and wrote many of Collor's public speeches. He died of cancer in January 1991, before Collor's downfall in 1992.

Books
Published in Portuguese
 1963: Poesia do Brasil, (antologia com Manuel Bandeira)
 1965: Razão do Poema
 1969: Arte e Sociedade em Marcuse, Adorno e Benjamin
 1972: A astúcia da mímese
 1972: Saudades do Carnaval
 1974: Formalismo e tradição moderna
 1975: O estruturalismo dos pobres e outras questões
 1975: A estética de Lévi-Strauss
 1976: Verso e universo de Drummond
 1977: De Anchieta a Euclides
 1980: O fantasma romântico e outros ensaios
 1981: As idéias e as formas
 1982: A natureza do processo
 1983: O argumento liberal
 1983: O elixir do Apocalipse
 1985: Michel Foucault ou O niilismo da cátedra
 1987: O marxismo ocidental
 1990: Crítica
 1990: Rousseau e Weber: dois estudos sobre a teoria da legitimidade
 1991: De Praga a Paris: uma crítica do estruturalismo e do pensamento pós-estruturalista
 1991: O liberalismo, antigo e moderno
 1997: O véu e a máscara

Published in English
 1979: The veil and the mask: Essays on culture and ideology
 1980: Rousseau and Weber: Two studies in the theory of legitimacy
 1985: Foucault (Merquior book)
 1987: From Prague to Paris: A Critique of Structuralist and Post-Structuralist Thought
 1991: Western Marxism
 1991: Liberalism, Old and New
 1991: Foucault

Published in French
 1986: Foucault ou le nihilisme de la chaire

Published in Spanish
 1996 Liberalismo Viejo y Nuevo
 2005 El Comportamiento de Las Musas

In memoriam
 1996 Liberalism in Modern Times - Essays in Honour of José G. Merquior. Edited by Ernest Gellner and César Cansino

See also 
 Liberal Party (Brazil, 1985)
 Roberto Campos

References

1941 births
1991 deaths
20th-century Brazilian philosophers
Alumni of the London School of Economics
Ambassadors of Brazil to Mexico
Anti-communism in Brazil
Brazilian diplomats
Brazilian literary critics
Brazilian male writers
Brazilian philosophers
Brazilian social liberals
Brazilian sociologists
Conservatism in Brazil
Foucault scholars
Liberalism in Brazil
Members of the Brazilian Academy of Letters
Scholars of Marxism
Writers from Rio de Janeiro (city)